Odostomia funiculustriata is a species of sea snail, a marine gastropod mollusc in the family Pyramidellidae, the pyrams and their allies.

References

External links
 To Encyclopedia of Life
 To USNM Invertebrate Zoology Mollusca Collection
 To World Register of Marine Species

funiculustriata
Gastropods described in 1999